A. Vijayaraghavan is an Indian politician belonging to the Communist Party of India (Marxist), and was the Convener of Left Democratic Front in Kerala and former Acting Secretary of  CPI(M) Kerala State Committee. He was born at Malappuram. He was a Member of the Parliament of India representing Kerala in the Rajya Sabha, the upper house of the Parliament. He was the chairman of parliamentary committees on Subordinate Legislation and General Assurances, He was also the Chief Whip of CPI(M) in Rajya Sabha. He was elected to Lok Sabha from Palakkad in 1989. He is the Central Secretariat member of CPI(M) and General Secretary of All India Agricultural Workers Union.

He contested in 2014 Indian general election from Kozhikode (Lok Sabha constituency). He has also got a bachelor's in law degree from Government Law College, Kozhikode. He is married to Prof. R. Bindu, who is herself a popular party worker and a teacher in Sree Kerala Varma College, Thrissur. He lives in Thrissur. He has also served as the president of the Students Federation of India. He is also the director of the Malayalam Communications Limited. He was also a member of the Indian contingent for the General Assembly of the United Nations. He is currently serving as the All India General Secretary of the All India Agricultural Workers Union.

References

Official Web Site: www.avijayaraghavan.com

External links

 Profile on Rajya Sabha website

Communist Party of India (Marxist) politicians from Kerala
Rajya Sabha members from Kerala
Living people
University of Calicut alumni
People from Malappuram district
Communist Party of India (Marxist) candidates in the 2014 Indian general election
20th-century Indian politicians
21st-century Indian politicians
Year of birth missing (living people)
Students' Federation of India All India Presidents